Ryan St. Onge (born February 7, 1983) is an American freestyle skier who has competed since 1997.

Career
He won a gold medal in the aerials event at the FIS Freestyle World Ski Championships 2009 in Inawashiro.

At the 2006 Winter Olympics in Turin, St. Onge finished 16th in the aerials event.

He also has seven World Cup victories in aerials from 2005 to 2009.

St. Onge was named to the US team for the 2010 Winter Olympics in January 2010, qualified and finished fourth.

References
 
 
 

1983 births
American male freestyle skiers
Freestyle skiers at the 2006 Winter Olympics
Freestyle skiers at the 2010 Winter Olympics
Living people
Olympic freestyle skiers of the United States